Geranak (also Romanized as Gerānak) is a village in Gavkan Rural District, in the Central District of Rigan County, Kerman Province, Iran. At the 2006 census, its population was 46, in 10 families.

References 

Populated places in Rigan County